Jhotwara is a suburban area of Jaipur in the north-west direction of Jaipur, the capital of Indian State of Rajasthan. It is a Legislative Assembly constituency

History

This area was under meena tribe which was annexed in Kachhwaha Rajput kingdom of Amber by Rao Dulha. It was ruled by the Jaipur royal family till Independence of India.

Area under Jhotwara 
These are 22 ward under Jhotwara.

Vaishali Nagar
Kanakpura
Panchyawala
Meenawala
Girdharipura
Lalpura
Dhawas
Heerapura
Gajsinghpura
Mukumdpura
Maharajpura
Bindayka
Sirsi

References 

Cities and towns in Jaipur district
Neighbourhoods in Jaipur